Acacia kalgoorliensis is a shrub of the genus Acacia and the subgenus Plurinerves. It is native to an area in the Mid West, Wheatbelt and Goldfields-Esperance regions of Western Australia.

It blooms from July to October and produces yellow flowers.

See also
List of Acacia species

References

kalgoorliensis
Acacias of Western Australia
Taxa named by Bruce Maslin